Holy Redeemer Church in Bangkok, Thailand is a Roman Catholic church established by the Congregation of the Most Holy Redeemer (also known as the Redemptorists). It is part of the Roman Catholic Archdiocese of Bangkok, part of the province of Thailand.

Location
The church is located in Soi Ruamrudee, off Phloen Chit BTS Station, close to the foreign embassy district in the city.

Liturgy
The church celebrates mass daily with separate services in Thai and English. The musical elements of the services are provided by an electronic organ and the participation of the congregation.

History
The Parish of Holy Redeemer was established by the Redemptorists in 1949, with the church itself being built in 1954. It is built in the traditional Thai architectural style.

Community
Its location in the city lends itself to a large congregation catering to local and international parishioners from many different cultures and walks of life. It also draws many of its congregation from the Klong Toey slums.

Schools

The Redemptorists, with the support of expatriate parishioners, founded the Ruamrudee International School in 1957. The school is now located in Minburi and has grown to have a student population of approximately 1300. It grew from the original Thai-medium school, Holy Redeemer School, which remains on the parish property. Ruamrudee follows the American curriculum and uses English as its medium of instruction while Holy Redeemer follows the local curriculum.

Marriage preparation
The parish has a well-established marriage preparation program (Pre-Cana instruction) and serves as the main centre for Roman Catholic parishes in Bangkok to send couples for marriage preparation.

Food outreach program

The church supports a Food Outreach Program that aims to help people who are asylum seekers, mostly from Pakistan with others from Sri Lanka, Palestine and Syria. Started in 2009, it now supports more than 400 families each month

Social outreach

The Thailand Redemptorists have also developed numerous other community-based programs or institutions, including:
 Sarnelli House Thailand, an orphanage for children who have been abandoned or who have HIV/AIDS
 Human Development Foundation Mercy Centre, a "shelter for street kids, five orphanages, a hospice, a home for mothers and children with HIV/AIDS, a 400-pupil kindergarten, a community meeting place, and a serene haven in the slums with small gardens and playgrounds
 Father Ray Foundation, an organisation that cares for "orphaned, abused and disadvantaged children and students with disabilities

Community services
 Overeaters Anonymous, a support group for overeaters, particularly expats in Bangkok
 Alcoholics Anonymous meeting place

Gallery

See also

 Ruamrudee International School - founded by Redemptorist priests from the church
 Roman Catholicism in Thailand
 Christianity in Thailand
 List of Roman Catholic dioceses in Thailand
 Roman Catholic Archdiocese of Bangkok
Roman Catholic Mission of Bangkok (LiCAS.news)
 Wat Niwet Thammaprawat - a Thai Buddhist temple built in Christian Gothic Revival style

References

External links
 Official Website of the Church 
 Food Outreach Program
 The Holy See (The Vatican)
 Sarnelli Orphanage
 Human Development Foundation Mercy Centre

Roman Catholic churches in Bangkok
Redemptorist churches
Pathum Wan district